Nematology is a peer-reviewed scientific journal covering the study of nematodes.

In 1978, French zoologist Michel Luc established the Revue de Nématologie (soon renamed Fundamental and Applied Nematology) that fused with Nematologica in 1999 to become Nematology. The editors-in-chief are David Hunt (CABI Europe) and Roland Perry (Rothamsted Research).

References

External links 
 

Nematology journals
Brill Publishers academic journals